D2B (Thai: ดีทูบี) was a Thai boy band from the Thai record label, RS promotion. The number one boy band of all time in Thailand, being the top boy band in Asia Received the MTV Asia Awards 2003.

Members
The three members of the group were: Apichet Kittikorncharoen, nickname Big (born 2 December 1982 – died 9 December 2007), Worrawech Danuwong, nickname Dan, (born 16 May 1984), and Kawee Tanjararak, nickname Beam, (born 18 May 1980).

History
The name "D2B" was created from the first letters of the members' nicknames, Dan, Big, and Beam, in which one name started with a "D" and 2 names started with a "B".

It is a popular Thai boy band that has sold more than a million copies, every album.

On July 22, 2003, Big was in a major accident where his car flipped into a dirty roadside canal, leading to a bacterial infection in his brain. After being in a coma and persistent vegetative state for 4 years, he died on December 9, 2007.

After Big had slipped into a coma, Dan and Beam continued their musical careers and released several duo albums. They went by the name "Dan-Beam". In 2005 Dan and Beam came out with their first album together called "Dan-Beam the album". Then in 2006 they came out with the second album " Dan-Beam the 2nd album Relax" and in 2007 they came out with their third album "Dan-Beam the 3rd album Freedom" and last and special album "DB2B". Worawech Danuwong (Dan) decided to leave RS Promotion and announced this decision on October 25, 2007. That meant the termination of D2B as well. And, soon after, Big died on December 9, 2007. Beam still remained under RS. However, in June 2010, RS suspended Beam and decided not to renew his contract. Now, Dan works under contract with Sony Entertainment and Beam is a freelance artist.

Membership period

Discography

Studio albums

D2B 
 2001: D2B
 2002: D2B Summer
 2003: D2B Type II
 2004: D2B The Neverending Album Tribute To Big D2B

Dan-Beam 
 2005: Dan-Beam The Album
 2006: Dan-Beam The Album II Relax
 2007: Dan-Beam The Album 3 Freedom
 2007: DB2B (Dan & Beam To Big)

Special Project 
 TV SoundTrack: WaiRaiFreshy
 Movie SoundTrack: Sexphone & The Lonely Wave
 Movie SoundTrack: Noodles Boxer
 THE MESSAGES – Various Artists
 MISS MOM 2 (Thai: คิดถึงแม่ เรียงความเรื่องแม่) – Various Artists
 DAD (Thai: ลูกของพ่อ) – Various Artists

Concerts 
 2002: D2B Summer Live In Concert
 2002: D2B GoodTime Thanks Concert For Friends
 2003: D2B The Miracle Concert
 2004: D2B The Neverending Concert Tribute To Big D2B
 2005: Dan&Beam Concert KidMark
 2005: Dan&Beam Unseen Concert
 2006: Nice Club Concert By Dan&Beam
 2007: Dan&Beam Freedom Around The World Live In Concert
 2008: Beam Solo Concert : One Man and FanKraiMaiRoo Concert
 2008: Beam Solo Concert : Halloo Beam Concert
 2009: Dan Solo Concert : My Blue Concert
 2014: "Kid-Teung" (Missing) D2B Live Concert 2014 
 2015: "Wonderful.....Nostalgia D2B ENCORE CONCERT 2015"
 2019: "D2B Infinity Concert 2019"

Filmography

Films 
 2001:  Where is Tong (Thai: ๙ พระคุ้มครอง) starring: Beam D2B
 2003: Sanghorn : Omen (Thai: สังหรณ์) starring: D2B
 2003: Sexphone & The Lonely Wave : The Girl Next Door(Thai: Sexphone/คลื่นเหงา/สาวข้างบ้าน) starring: Beam D2B and Paula Taylor
 2006: Noodles Boxer (Thai: แสบสนิท ศิษย์ส่ายหน้า) starring: Dan D2B and Jah Nutthaveeranuch Thongmee, Beam D2B as a cameo appearance
 2007: Ponglang Amazing Theater (Thai: โปงลางสะดิ้ง ลำซิ่งส่ายหน้า) starring: Beam D2B, Mai Wisa Sarasart, Ponglangsaon The Band

Television Series (Lakorns) 
 2002: WaiRaiFreshy (Thai: วัยร้ายเฟรชชี่) – (Dan & Big)
 2004: KooKam 2 (Thai: คู่กรรม 2) – (Dan)
 2005: PeeNongSongLuead (Thai: พี่น้องสองเลือด) – (Dan & Beam)
 2005: RotDuanKabuanSudtai (Thai: รถด่วนขบวนสุดท้าย) – (Beam)
 2005: HoiAnChunRukTher (Thai: ฮอยอัน ฉันรักเธอ) – (Dan)
 2005: NaiKrajok (Thai: นายกระจอก) – (Dan)
 2005: JaAerBaby (Hi Baby!) (Thai: จ๊ะเอ๋ เบบี้) – (Beam)
 2006: MonRukLottery (Thai: มนต์รักล็อตเตอรี่) – (Dan)
 2006: MungKornSornPayuk (Thai: มังกรซ่อนพยัคฆ์) – (Beam)
 2006: PeeChai (Thai: พี่ชาย) – (Dan)
 2007: PootRukNamo (Thai: ภูตรักนะโม) – (Dan & Beam)
 2007: PeeKaewNangHong (Thai: ปี่แก้วนางหงส์) – (Dan)
 2008: KooPunKooPuan (Thai: คู่ปั่นคู่ป่วน) – (Beam)
 2008: SeePaanDin (Special program) (Thai: สี่แผ่นดิน(ฉบับ พระปกเกล้าราชา ก่อนาวาประชาธิปไตย) – (Beam)
 2009: SetThiKangKiang (Thai: เศรษฐีข้างเขียง) – (Beam)
 2009: KuLarbSornNarm (Thai: กุหลาบซ่อนหนาม) – (Dan)
 2009: Spy the Series (Thai: สายลับเดอะซีรี่ส์ กับ 24 คดีสุดห้ามใจ) – (Dan)
 2010: Chocolate 5 Season (Thai: ช็อคโกแลตห้าฤดู) - (Dan)
 2011: SudYod (Thai: สุดยอด) – (Dan)
 2011: SuebSuanPuanRak (Thai: สืบสวนป่วนรัก) – (Dan)
 2011: PhomRakLukSaoJaoPho (Thai: ช่วยด้วยครับ ผมรั(ลั)กลูกสาวเจ้าพ่อ) – (Dan)
 2011: Love Therapy (Thai: บำบัดรักบำรุงสุข) – (Beam)
 2012: JoodNatPob (Thai: จุดนัดภพ) – (Beam)
 2012: SudYod (Thai: สุดยอด ปีสอง) – (Dan)
 2012: MaeTangRomBai (Thai: แม่แตงร่มใบ) – (Beam)
 2012: TanChaiNaiSaiMork (Thai: ท่านชายในสายหมอก) – (Beam) ... Guest
 2012: JoodNatPob Year 2 (Thai: จุดนัดภพ ปีสอง) – (Beam)
 2012: The Raven and the Swan (Thai: กากับหงส์) – (Beam)
 -: RakSudRid (Thai: รักสุดฤทธิ์) – (Beam)

Dramas

Series

Sitcom

Film

Master of Ceremony: MC ON TV

References 

Thai pop music groups
Thai boy bands